Saraya Jade Bevis (born 17 August 1992) is an English professional wrestler. She is signed to All Elite Wrestling (AEW), where she performs as Saraya. She is best known for her time with WWE under the ring name Paige. She was a two-time (and the youngest) WWE Divas Champion and the inaugural NXT Women's Champion. She is the only woman to ever hold both Divas and NXT Women's Championships simultaneously.

In 2005, at the age of 13, Bevis made her debut under the ring name Britani Knight for her family's World Association of Wrestling promotion. She went on to hold several championships on the European independent circuit. After talent scouting in England, WWE signed Bevis in 2011, and she began wrestling in its developmental systems, debuting on Florida Championship Wrestling in 2012 and later going on a winning streak in NXT. In her 2014 debut match on the main roster, she won the Divas Championship at the age of 21 years 233 days, making the youngest WWE Divas Champion in its history.

In 2015 and 2016, Paige went on hiatus due to injury, undergoing neck surgery in October 2016. In December 2017, she suffered an impact injury to the neck at a match, preventing her from competing further. Paige formally retired from in-ring competition in 2018 due to injury, at age 25. Following her retirement, she remained with WWE as a contributor to WWE-related programs and fulfilled managing roles until her contract with the company expired in July 2022. In September 2022, she officially signed with AEW and made her debut for the company at Grand Slam.

Paige ranked No. 1 in Pro Wrestling Illustrateds Female 50 and was named Diva of the Year by Rolling Stone in 2014. In 2018, she received the WWE Year-End Award for General Manager of the Year. In 2012, Channel 4 produced a documentary about Saraya and her family, The Wrestlers: Fighting with My Family, which was adapted into the 2019 feature film Fighting with My Family.

Early life 

Saraya Jade Bevis was born in Norwich on 17 August 1992. She is part of a professional wrestling family; her parents, Julia Hamer-Bevis and Patrick Bevis, and her older brothers, Roy Bevis and Zak Bevis, are wrestlers. The family runs the World Association of Wrestling promotion in Norwich and her mother owns and operates Bellatrix Female Warriors, a women's wrestling promotion also based in Norwich. Bevis' mother once wrestled not knowing she was seven months pregnant with Bevis. Bevis and her family lived in a council house in Norwich. She attended The Hewett School in Norwich. As a child, she was scared of wrestling because of the injuries her family received, and had wanted to become a zoologist. From age 10, Bevis would occasionally get in the ring and fight one of her brothers, and her father would teach her wrestling moves. Bevis' younger brother died when she was 13. At the age of 15, she worked as a bouncer and bartender at her parents' pub while they were away.

Professional wrestling career

European independent circuit (2005–2011) 
Bevis made her debut in 2005, at the age of 13, when her father, who was running a wrestling show, asked her to replace a wrestler who failed to turn up. Her earliest recorded match was in April 2006 when she, using the ring name Britani Knight, teamed with her mother for a loss in a triple threat tag team match in World Association of Wrestling (WAW). Knight then allied with Melodi to form a tag team called the Norfolk Dolls (based on the movie The California Dolls) and they wrestled in multiple English promotions. The Norfolk Dolls won the new World Association of Women's Wrestling (WAWW) Tag Team Championship in June 2007 by defeating the Legion of Womb, but it became inactive due to no title defences by the Norfolk Dolls.

At the age of 14, Knight sent résumés to numerous wrestling promotions around Europe and earned a chance to wrestle in countries like Scotland, Ireland, Wales, Belgium, France, Turkey, Denmark, Norway, and Germany, as well as the United States, managing to travel by herself at 14. She began to compete for singles championships without much initial success. In Scotland, Knight competed for the World Wide Wrestling League (W3L) Women's Title, but lost to Sara in the tournament finals in September 2007. In December 2007, Knight took part in a tournament where the winner would become the first WAWW British Champion, but lost in the finals to Jetta. In 2008, Knight challenged both Sara and Jetta for their respective titles, but failed in her title bids.

Knight went on to achieve more singles success from 2009. In August 2009, Knight defeated her mother Sweet Saraya in a two-out-of-three falls match to capture the vacant Herts and Essex (HEW) Women's Championship. Later that month, Knight once again defeated Saraya to capture the WAWW British Championship. In November 2009, Knight captured the Real Deal Wrestling (RDW) Women's Championship from her mother in an elimination match also featuring Chelsey Love and Stacey Baybie. In December 2009, while in HEW, Knight won the RQW Women's Championship by defeating Jetta in a champion vs. champion match with her HEW Women's Championship on the line. In May 2010, Knight and her mother challenged Amazon and Ananya for the PWF Ladies Tag Team Championship, which they won. On 17 July 2010, Knight lost the HEW Women's Championship to her mother.

On 22 January 2011, Knight captured the German Stampede Wrestling Ladies' Championship from Blue Nikita. Knight also competed at debut show of Turkish Power Wrestling in Ankara in January 2011, with a losing effort against Shanna for the inaugural TPW Ladies Crown. On 11 March, she recaptured the HEW Women's Championship from her mother. Knight returned to Pro-Wrestling: EVE on 8 April to participate in a two-night tournament to crown the first ever Pro-Wrestling: EVE Champion. In the first night, Knight lost a four-way match to Jenny Sjödin, won a Last Chance battle royal, then defeated Sjödin in the quarter-final match. The next day, she defeated Jetta in the semi-final match, and later in the finals defeated Nikki Storm to win the Pro Wrestling: EVE Championship. On 30 April, Knight won the SCW Ladies Championship by defeating champion Amy Cooper. Also in 2011, Knight won an elimination match to become WAWW Hardcore Champion.

On 4 June, Knight lost her Pro-Wrestling: EVE Championship to Jenny Sjödin, and on 26 June, Knight lost her SCW Ladies Championship to her mother during a four-way match also involving Amy Cooper and Laura Wellings. On 2 August, Knight and her mother lost their PWF Ladies Tag Team Championship to Amazon and Destiny in a two-out-of-three falls match. On 12 November, Knight vacated the HEW Women's Championship. Knight also lost the WAWW British Championship to Liberty on 19 November 2011, while also vacating the RQW Women's Championship on that day.

Shimmer Women Athletes (2011) 
Bevis, again billed as Britani Knight, debuted for the American all-female promotion Shimmer Women Athletes on 26 March 2011 at the tapings of Volume 37 in Berwyn, Illinois. Teaming with her mother Saraya Knight, as the Knight Dynasty, they were managed by Rebecca Knox and defeated Nikki Roxx and Ariel via disqualification after the other team used the Dynasty's brass knuckles. This led to the Knight Dynasty receiving Shimmer Tag Team Championship match against the Seven Star Sisters (Hiroyo Matsumoto and Misaki Ohata) at Volume 38, which the Knight Dynasty lost.

In October 2011 at Volume 42, the Knight Dynasty lost another Shimmer Tag Team Championship match against champions Ayako Hamada and Ayumi Kurihara when Saraya refused to help Britani. Saraya then scolded Britani after the match. At Volume 43, Britani lost to Jessie McKay, which was her third consecutive loss. This led to Saraya disowning (in storyline) and slapping Britani, before a brawl between the two ensued and had to be pulled apart. Britani subsequently challenged Saraya to a match at Volume 44, where Britani defeated Saraya under no disqualification rules, in what was her final Shimmer match.

WWE (2011-2022)

Florida Championship Wrestling (2011–2012) 

Bevis was first informed that there would be try-outs for WWE when a talent scout came to a show in England. She was unsuccessful in her first try in November 2010, but succeeded in April 2011. In September 2011, Bevis signed a contract with WWE and was assigned to its then-developmental territory, Florida Championship Wrestling (FCW). She made her debut for FCW at a house show on 5 January 2012, using the ring name Saraya. Her ring name was then changed to Paige, as she made her televised debut in an appearance on the 26 February episode of FCW TV. Bevis chose the name in homage to Paige Matthews from Charmed, who had "a butt chin like me". From March 2012, Paige formed an alliance with Sofia Cortez, dubbing themselves the "Anti-Diva Army". Paige made her televised in-ring debut in a tag team match alongside Cortez on 19 March, where the duo lost to Audrey Marie and Kaitlyn. Paige and Cortez then formed a brief association with Rick Victor, winning a mixed tag team match against Audrey Marie and Aiden English. On 6 May, Paige pinned the FCW Divas Champion, Raquel Diaz in a non-title triple threat match, which also involved Audrey Marie. This earned Paige a championship match against Diaz on the 27 May episode of FCW TV, where Diaz's chicanery led to Paige being disqualified and Diaz retained her title. Dissension was teased within the Anti-Diva Army as Paige moved on to feud with Audrey Marie. Paige lost to Marie on 11 June on FCW TV after Cortez interfered against her, signalling the end of the alliance. On the final episode of FCW TV on 15 July, Paige and Cortez ended their feud with Marie emerging victorious in a no disqualification match.

NXT Women's Champion (2012–2014) 
WWE went on to rebrand its developmental territory FCW into NXT. Paige's NXT television debut took place on the third episode of the rebooted NXT, taped at Full Sail University, in which she lost to Sofia Cortez. From September 2012, after gaining a large surge in crowd support Paige went on a winning streak defeating the likes of Audrey Marie, Sasha Banks, Emma, Aksana, and multiple victories over Alicia Fox.

On 30 January 2013, Paige was assaulted by ring announcer Summer Rae, due to Rae's jealousy of Paige's popularity and success. On the 13 February episode of NXT, Paige suffered a shoulder injury after brawling with Rae, which Rae exploited later that episode to end Paige's undefeated streak. After Paige continued to confront Rae, Paige defeated Rae in a singles match, despite Rae's pre-match attack, on the 1 May episode of NXT. In June, Paige entered a tournament to determine the first NXT Women's Champion. She defeated Tamina Snuka and Alicia Fox en route to the final, in which she defeated Emma to become the inaugural champion (the episode aired on tape delay on 24 July 2013, the day WWE officially begins her reign).

Paige made her first successful title defence on the 14 August episode of NXT, defeating Summer Rae. In the following months, Paige teamed up with Emma to feud with Summer Rae and Sasha Banks. Paige successfully defended her title against Natalya on the 4 December episode of NXT, and against Emma on 27 February 2014 at NXT Arrival. On 24 April, Paige was forced to vacate her NXT Women's Championship and not defend it again (ending her reign at 301 days) due to winning the Divas Championship.

Divas Champion (2014–2015) 

Paige surprisingly made her main roster debut on the 7 April 2014 episode of Raw, the night after WrestleMania XXX, congratulating Divas Champion AJ Lee on her successful title defence at the pay-per-view event, after which AJ slapped Paige, challenging her to an impromptu match for the championship, which Paige quickly won, making her the youngest Divas Champion in history at the age of 21, the first Diva to win the title in her debut match and the only woman to hold both Divas and NXT Women's Championships at the same time. Paige had her first successful title defence on the 28 April episode of Raw in an impromptu match against Brie Bella, which went to a no contest due to Kane attacking Brie, as Paige escaped. In her first successful title defence on pay-per-view, Paige defeated Tamina Snuka on 4 May at Extreme Rules.

Paige suffered her first defeat on the main roster on the 19 May episode of Raw against Alicia Fox in a non-title match, which led to a title match between the two at Payback, where Paige prevailed. In June, Paige started a feud with Cameron and defeated her in two non-title matches. However, Cameron's tag team partner Naomi went on to defeat Paige in a non-title match and was granted a title match at Money in the Bank, which Paige won. During this time, WWE was criticised for failing to develop Paige's character despite being able to do so for Paige's opponents and for portraying Paige as a vulnerable champion while she was proving herself in the storyline.

On the post-Money in the Bank episode of Raw on 30 June, a role reversal occurred when a returning AJ Lee quickly defeated Paige in a title match to regain the Divas Championship, in which Paige was initially reluctant to face Lee, but she then agreed to the match per request of the live audience. Despite the championship loss, Paige acted as if she were best friends with Lee during tag matches in which they teamed together. At Battleground, Paige lost a rematch for the Divas Championship to Lee. On the post-Battleground episode of Raw on 21 July, after Paige and Lee won a tag match against Emma and Natalya, Paige turned villainous after viciously assaulting Lee. This eventually set up another title match between the two on 17 August, Paige's 22nd birthday, at SummerSlam, which Paige won to capture her second Divas Championship. A month later at Night of Champions, Paige lost the title back to Lee in a triple threat match which also involved Nikki Bella. Paige then formed an alliance with Alicia Fox while still feuding with Lee but after Fox failed to secure Paige a victory in another title match against Lee at Hell in a Cell, Paige dissolved their alliance by attacking Fox the following night on Raw. At Survivor Series, Paige participated in a 4-on-4 elimination tag team match where she was the last person from her team to be eliminated, courtesy of Naomi.

On the 5 January 2015 episode of Raw, Paige became a fan favourite again as she rescued Natalya from a post-match assault by Divas Champion Nikki Bella which led to a non-title match between the two the following night on Main Event, which Paige won. This led to a tag team match between Paige and Natalya against The Bella Twins at the Royal Rumble, which The Bella Twins won. Following weeks of being tormented by The Bella Twins, Paige unsuccessfully challenged Nikki for the Divas Championship at Fastlane and on the 2 March episode of Raw, after which, the returning AJ Lee saved Paige from a post-match attack by The Bellas. This led to a tag team match at WrestleMania 31 between Paige and Lee against The Bella Twins, which Paige and Lee won in Paige's WrestleMania début. On the 13 April episode of Raw, Paige won a battle royal to become the number one contender to Nikki Bella's Divas Championship and was attacked after the match by Naomi, who injured her in the storyline and made her unable to compete. Paige returned on the 18 May episode of Raw, after a one-month absence, saving Nikki Bella from an attack by Naomi and Tamina Snuka, before attacking Bella as well. This prompted a triple threat match between Paige, Naomi and Nikki at Elimination Chamber, which Paige lost. In June, Paige went on to unsuccessfully challenge Nikki for the championship in two singles matches on Raw and Money in the Bank, after Nikki and Brie switched places and in a triple threat match on 4 July at The Beast in the East, which also involved Tamina.

Women's Revolution (2015–2016) 
On the 13 July episode of Raw, after weeks of being outnumbered by The Bella Twins and their ally Alicia Fox, Stephanie McMahon called for a "revolution" in the Divas division, introducing the débuting Charlotte and Becky Lynch as Paige's allies and NXT Women's Champion Sasha Banks as an ally of Naomi and Tamina, which led to a brawl between the three teams. The trio of Paige, Charlotte and Becky, originally dubbed "Submission Sorority", was renamed "Team PCB", after the first-name initials of each wrestler. The three teams would ultimately face off at SummerSlam in a three-team elimination match, which PCB won after Becky Lynch pinned Brie Bella. On the 31 August episode of Raw, all members of PCB competed in the first ever "Divas beat the clock challenge", but Charlotte was named number one contender for the Divas Championship, as Paige fought Sasha Banks to a time limit draw. This led to two matches between Paige and Banks on the 7 and 14 September episodes of Raw, which Banks won, and on the 10 September episode of SmackDown, where the two fought to a no contest.

Charlotte won the Divas Championship from Nikki Bella on 20 September at Night of Champions, and during her celebration the following night on Raw, Paige turned on her partners and cut a worked shoot promo, where she claimed Charlotte was only there because of her father and berated other members of the Divas division, including Becky and Natalya. This also led to Paige having multiple confrontations with Natalya. Throughout October, Paige acted as if she wanted to reconcile with Becky and Charlotte, only to attack them. In November, Paige became the new number one contender for Charlotte's Divas Championship after winning a fatal four-way match, but was unsuccessful in regaining the title on three different occasions: at Survivor Series, when she lost by submission, the following night on Raw in a rematch, which ended in a double countout, and at TLC, when she once again lost.

Paige took some time off television after her rivalry with Charlotte due to injury, and returned on the 18 January 2016 episode of Raw, accompanying her former rival Natalya to her match against Brie Bella. Upon her return, Paige started competing in various singles and tag team matches, ending on both winning and losing sides. Paige then aligned herself with fellow Total Divas cast members Brie Bella, Natalya, Alicia Fox and Eva Marie, facing Lana, Naomi, Tamina, Summer Rae and Emma in a 10-Diva tag team match on the WrestleMania 32 kick-off show, in which Paige's team emerged victorious. After defeating WWE Women's Champion Charlotte on two occasions, Paige was granted a title match on the 20 June episode of Raw, where she failed to capture the title, and would be attacked by Charlotte and her accomplice Dana Brooke post-match, before being saved by Sasha Banks. This led to a tag team match the following week on the 27 June episode of Raw, where Paige and Banks scored the victory.

Neck injuries and first retirement (2016–2018) 

As part of the 2016 WWE draft which took place on 19 July, Paige was drafted to Raw. On 3 August, her mother revealed on Twitter that she was on a hiatus due to a neck injury. On 17 August, Paige was suspended for 30 days after violating the company's wellness policy. She later explained that she had not failed a drug test, but that the suspension was due to a procedural issue. In September 2016, Paige revealed that she would be undergoing neck surgery and would not be wrestling for an undisclosed amount of time. On 10 October, Paige was suspended again for her second violation of the wellness policy; this time for 60 days. Bevis subsequently tweeted, "Same shit different day. Kids..Please don't get prescriptions or doctors notes. Not acceptable". Her father released a statement saying she had been prescribed medication for her neck injury. However, WWE issued a statement, saying that she had "tested positive for an illegal substance, not a prescription drug". On 19 October, she underwent successful neck surgery and was cleared to return to in-ring competition in September 2017.

On 20 November 2017, Paige returned on Raw as a heel to attack Sasha Banks, Bayley, Mickie James and Raw Women's Champion Alexa Bliss. Paige was joined in her attack by the debuting Mandy Rose and Sonya Deville, with whom she formed the stable Absolution. Paige returned to in-ring action in her first match since June 2016 on the 4 December episode of Raw, defeating Sasha Banks. Later in the night, the group attacked Alicia Fox. At a house show on 27 December, Paige suffered another neck injury after taking a kick from Sasha Banks in a six-woman tag team match, thus forcing the referee to stop the match. The injury,  kept her from competing at the Royal Rumble. Paige continued to accompany her fellow Absolution members in their matches; but did not return to in-ring competition. During the WrestleMania 34 kick-off show, Paige made a cameo appearance as part of the commentary team for the first ever WrestleMania Women's Battle Royal. On the post-Wrestlemania episode of Raw on 9 April, Paige officially retired from in-ring competition due to her December 2017 neck injury.

Non-wrestling roles (2018–2022) 
The day after revealing her in-ring retirement, on the 10 April 2018 episode of SmackDown Live, Paige was announced by Shane McMahon (acting as the commissioner of the show) as the new general manager of SmackDown, turning her face once again and disbanding Absolution in the process. WWE Chairman Vince McMahon reportedly gave Paige this role to keep her on television to promote the film Fighting with My Family, which is based on her life. Paige retained the position throughout the rest of the year until the McMahon family announced that starting that night they are taking charge and the general manager position was quietly removed on the 17 December episode of Raw. The following night on SmackDown, Shane McMahon confirmed that Paige is to remain around the show but not in the same position.

After spending some weeks away to promote the film Fighting with My Family, Paige made a backstage appearance on the 10 April 2019 episode of SmackDown, where she announced that she would be bringing a new tag team to the division to feud with The IIconics (Billie Kay and Peyton Royce) for their WWE Women's Tag Team Championship. A week later, Paige began managing the newly formed team of Asuka and new SmackDown draftee Kairi Sane called the Kabuki Warriors. The duo would initially be unsuccessful; however, while Paige was on an off-screen hiatus due to undergoing neck surgery, the duo would capture the titles on 6 October at Hell in a Cell, turning heel in the process. When Paige came back to congratulate them on the 28 October, episode of Raw, the duo turned on her, with Asuka spraying Paige's face with green mist, effectively severing ties with her. She then became a contributor for WWE's studio show WWE Backstage, which premiered on 5 November on FS1.

Paige returned to SmackDown via Skype on 20 March 2020, to confront SmackDown Women's Champion Bayley and Sasha Banks, where she announced that Bayley would defend her title in a six-way elimination match at WrestleMania 36 (though changed to five-way after Dana Brooke was removed from the match).

In 2021, Paige was ranked No. 17 on WWE's list of The 50 Greatest Women Superstars of all time.

On 10 June 2022, Paige announced her departure from WWE on her Twitter account, effective July 7.

All Elite Wrestling (2022–present)
On September 21, 2022, Saraya made her debut for AEW at Grand Slam in Queens, New York. On the October 5 episode of AEW Dynamite, Saraya had a confrontation with Dr. Britt Baker, D.M.D. which led to a physical fight, marking the first time Saraya has gotten physical in wrestling since her December 2017 neck injury. On November 9 episode of Dynamite, Saraya announced she was 100% cleared to return to the ring and would wrestle her first match, since 2017, against Baker at Full Gear where Saraya successfully defeated Baker. 

Saraya had her second match on January 11, 2023, on AEW Dynamite where she teamed with Toni Storm in a losing effort to Dr. Britt Baker D.M.D. and the AEW Women's World Champion Jamie Hayter. Hikaru Shida accidentally assisted the opposing team with her signature kendo stick, where Baker was able to capitalize, allowing for Hayter to pin Storm for the win. The following week Saraya and Storm turned heel as they attacked Willow Nightingale and began slating the AEW homegrown talent.  On March 5 at AEW Revolution Saraya faced Ruby Soho and Hayter for the AEW Women's World Championship where Hayter picked up the win.

Other media 
In July 2012, Channel 4 produced a documentary about Bevis and her family titled The Wrestlers: Fighting with My Family. The documentary was adapted into the 2019 feature film Fighting with My Family, with Florence Pugh playing Bevis.

Paige has appeared in six WWE video games. She made her in-game debut as a downloadable character in WWE 2K15, and is featured as a playable character in WWE 2K16, WWE 2K17, WWE 2K18,WWE 2K19 and WWE 2K20.

In October 2014, Paige joined the cast of Total Divas, a reality television show produced by WWE and E!, for the second part of the show's third season, which began airing in 2015. Paige guest starred on the 14 January 2016 episode of the MTV series Ridiculousness. She appeared alongside Natalya, Brie Bella, and the Chrisley family on the 88th Academy Awards edition of E! Countdown to the Red Carpet on 28 February.

In March 2015, Paige was featured in Smosh's 131st installment of Game Bang, along with Xavier Woods, Seth Rollins, and Daniel Bryan. Paige frequently appears at Wizard World comic con events across the United States, hosting fan signings, photo ops, and Q&A sessions. In June 2015, Paige became one of the judges on the sixth season of Tough Enough. Before the show started, Paige predicted that she would fulfill a role similar to Simon Cowell as a judge. On 3 August 2015, Paige was a guest on Stone Cold Steve Austin's Stone Cold Podcast, which aired on the WWE Network. She was a guest on Conan on 22 October.

Paige has appeared in two WWE Studios films; Santa's Little Helper, released in November 2015, and Scooby-Doo! and WWE: Curse of the Speed Demon, in which she provided a voice role and was released in July 2016. She provided a voice role in the WWE Studios and Sony Pictures Animation film Surf's Up 2: WaveMania, which was released in 2017.

Paige was featured in the WWE Network special WWE Chronicle that premiered on 26 January 2019.

Filmography

Business ventures 
In September 2015, Bevis co-launched a coffee company called The Dark Gypsy with Blackcraft Cult clothing company owners Bobby Schubenski and Jim Somers. However, in October 2016, Bevis tweeted that she was no longer affiliated with the company.

In December 2017, Paige launched an online clothing store under her real name, Saraya, at TheSarayaStore.com. She also announced that she would extend her brand to a brick and mortar store. On 26 February 2018, she held the grand opening of The Saraya Store in Anaheim, California. Soon after, Saraya Jade Cosmetics, a makeup line, was introduced. Saraya Jade Cosmetics launched on 16 November 2018. In 2019, she partnered with Hot Topic to launch an exclusive makeup collection.

Personal life 

Bevis resides in Los Angeles. She cites Bull Nakano, Alundra Blayze, Edge, Lita, Rikishi, Bret Hart, and Stone Cold Steve Austin as some of her favourite wrestlers. She suffers from scoliosis but was unaware that she had the condition until after signing with WWE, when a trainer noticed that her back looked "wrong". During her time at NXT, Bevis had gotten into a car accident and had to have surgery. Bevis has several tattoos, one of which is dedicated to her younger brother who died when she was 13.

On the WWE reality television show Total Divas, Bevis acknowledged having previously "been with another woman". She was engaged to A Day to Remember guitarist Kevin Skaff in early 2016 before they split up. In October 2016, Bevis became engaged to fellow wrestler Alberto Del Rio. They ended their relationship in late 2017. Since late 2018, she has been in a relationship with Falling in Reverse lead singer Ronnie Radke.

In March 2017, private nude photos and a sex tape featuring Bevis were leaked online. She responded that she was "looking into the future and being happy" and that she was hoping her "mistake could help people's future[s]". She later revealed that she suffered from "stress-induced anorexia" and considered suicide due to the incident.

Championships and accomplishments 

 German Stampede Wrestling
 GSW Ladies Championship (1 time)
 Herts & Essex Wrestling
 HEW Women's Championship (2 times)
 Premier Wrestling Federation
 PWF Ladies Tag Team Championship (1 time) – with Sweet Saraya
 Pro-Wrestling: EVE
 Pro-Wrestling: EVE Championship (1 time)
 Pro Wrestling Illustrated
 Ranked No. 1 of the top 50 female wrestlers in the PWI Female 50 in 2014, and No. 2 in 2015
 Real Deal Wrestling
 RDW Women's Championship (1 time)
 Real Quality Wrestling
 RQW Women's Championship (1 time)
 Rolling Stone
 Diva of the Year (2014)
 Swiss Championship Wrestling
 SCW Ladies Championship (1 time)
 World Association of Women's Wrestling
 WAWW British Ladies Championship (1 time)
 WAWW British Tag Team Championship (1 time) – with Melodi
 WAWW Ladies Hardcore Championship (1 time)
 Wrestling Observer Newsletter
 Worst Feud of the Year (2015) Team PCB vs. Team B.A.D. vs. Team Bella
 WWE
 NXT Women's Championship (1 time)
 WWE Divas Championship (2 times)
 NXT Women's Championship Tournament (2013)
 WWE Year-End Award (1 time)
 General Manager of the Year (2018)

Notes

References

External links 

 
 
 
 
 
 Saraya Store

1992 births
21st-century English actresses
English female professional wrestlers
English people of Cornish descent
Expatriate professional wrestlers
Living people
Professional wrestling authority figures
Sportspeople from Norwich
Twitch (service) streamers
NXT Women's Champions
21st-century professional wrestlers
WWE Divas Champions
Guinness World Records
All Elite Wrestling personnel